José Alonso Nieves (23 January 1944 – 1 November 1979) was a Puerto Rican boxer. He competed in the men's featherweight event at the 1964 Summer Olympics. At the 1964 Summer Olympics, he lost to Stanislav Stepashkin of the Soviet Union.

References

1944 births
1979 deaths
Puerto Rican male boxers
Olympic boxers of Puerto Rico
Boxers at the 1964 Summer Olympics
Place of birth missing
Featherweight boxers